Hogback is a mountain in Schoharie County, New York. It is located northeast of Cobleskill. Barrack Zourie is located northwest and Mount Shank is located southwest of Hogback.

References

Mountains of Schoharie County, New York
Mountains of New York (state)